The discography of DMA's, an Australian rock band formed in 2012 consists of three studio albums, 2 live albums, two extended plays and 34 singles (including two as a featured artist).

Albums

Studio albums

Live albums

Extended plays

Singles

As lead artists

As featured artists

Other certified songs

Music videos

References

Discographies of Australian artists